Trigonopeplus is a genus of beetles in the family Cerambycidae, containing the following species:

 Trigonopeplus abdominalis White, 1855
 Trigonopeplus binominis Chevrolat, 1861
 Trigonopeplus bispecularis White, 1855
 Trigonopeplus paterculus Lacordaire, 1872

References

Anisocerini